Jim Watson is a sportscaster with Fox Sports and formerly with NBC Sports.

Sportscasting career

NBC Sports Network
He called Gymnastics for the 2016 Rio Olympics. He called weightlifting for the 2012 London Olympics. He also calls water polo for Universal Sports. He has also served as a play-by-play announcer, anchor, reporter, and host for NBC Sports, Universal Sports, FOX Sports, ESPN3, Time Warner, and several other regional networks. He called Volleyball at the 2000 Summer Olympics.

Pac-12 Network and Fox Sports
Watson is also employed by the Pac-12 Network. There he calls football, basketball, baseball, swimming, and diving.
In addition to Pac-12 sports, he has also covered golf, tennis, cross-country, track-and-field, softball, soccer, and water polo. 
Watson is the host and reporter for Dodgers Live, a pregame/postgame show for the Los Angeles Dodgers and calls beach volleyball for the Beach Volleyball World Tour. He was also the voice of the Los Angeles Galaxy for five years.

Other sports
Watson has also covered motocross, snowboarding, wrestling, skiing, gymnastics, and weightlifting. He was also the host of Runnin' with the Pac.

Career Timeline
2005–present NBC Sports, Universal Sports, Fox Sports, The Mountain, and ESPN3 play-by-play, host, anchor, and reporter
MLB, NBA, MLS, FIVB, Pac-10/Pac-12, Big West, CIF High School Sports
2003-2005 Fox Sports Northwest (Seattle)
play-by-play, host, anchor, reporter
MLB, NBA, NFL, WNBA, Pac-10, West Coast, Conference, WIAA(Washington) High School Sports
2003-2005 Fox Sports West (Los Angeles) play-by-play, anchor, host, reporter
MLB, NBA, NHL, Pac-10, West Coast Conference, Big West Conference, CIF High School Sports

Olympics
2016: Gymnastics 2012: Weightlifting
2004: Indoor Volleyball
2000: Beach Volleyball

World Championships
2009-2012: NBC Sports, Universal Sports
Beach Volleyball, Team Volleyball, Water Polo, snowboarding, Wrestling, Rowing

Personal
He attended the University of Hawaii and the University of Southern California. He graduated from USC in 1989 with a Bachelor of Arts in Sports Information. He currently lives in Santa Monica, California.

References

Television anchors from Los Angeles
Living people
University of Southern California alumni
People from Santa Monica, California
Major League Baseball broadcasters
Los Angeles Dodgers announcers
College baseball announcers in the United States
Association football commentators
High school basketball announcers in the United States
High school football announcers in the United States
College basketball announcers in the United States
American television sports anchors
College football announcers
Golf writers and broadcasters
Tennis commentators
Olympic Games broadcasters
Beach Volleyball commentators
Volleyball commentators
Track and field broadcasters
Skiing announcers
Softball announcers
Gymnastics broadcasters
Women's National Basketball Association announcers
Year of birth missing (living people)